Full trisomy 9 is a rare and fatal chromosomal disorder caused by having three copies (trisomy) of chromosome number 9. It can be a viable condition if trisomy affects only part of the cells of the body (mosaicism) or in cases of partial trisomy (trisomy 9p) in which cells have a normal set of two entire chromosomes 9 plus part of a third copy, usually of the short arm of the chromosome (arm p).

Presentation
Symptoms vary, but usually result in dysmorphisms in the skull, nervous system problems, and developmental delay. Dysmorphisms in the heart, kidneys, and musculoskeletal system may also occur. An infant with complete trisomy 9 surviving 20 days after birth showed clinical features including a small face, wide fontanelle, prominent occiput, micrognathia, low set ears, upslanting palpebral fissures, high-arched palate, short sternum, overlapping fingers, limited hip abduction, rocker bottom feet, heart murmurs and a webbed neck.

Trisomy 9p is one of the most frequent autosomal anomalies compatible with long survival rate. A study of five cases showed an association with Coffin–Siris syndrome, as well as a wide gap between the first and second toes in all five, while three had brain malformations including dilated ventricles with hypogenesis of the corpus callosum and Dandy–Walker malformation.

Diagnosis
Trisomy 9 can be detected prenatally with chorionic villus sampling and cordocentesis, and can be suggested by obstetric ultrasonography.

Because trisomy 9 may appear with mosaicism, it is suggested that doctors take samples from multiple tissues when karyotyping for diagnosis.

References

External links 

NORD - National Organization for Rare Disorders, Inc. Chromosome 9, Trisomy 9p (Multiple Variants)
NORD - National Organization for Rare Disorders, Inc. Chromosome 9, Trisomy Mosaic

Autosomal trisomies